Geoffrey Tulasne (born 24 February 1988) is a French former professional footballer who played as a midfielder for FC Sochaux-Montbéliard and Red Star.

Club career
Tulasne was born in Péronne, France. A Sochaux youth product, he spent three years with the first team in which he made just 32 appearances. He left the club in 2011 after deciding not to renew his contract.

In November 2011, he trialled with Ligue 2 side Stade Lavallois.

In December 2012, free agent Tulasne signed a 1.5-year contract Paris-based club Red Star. In June 2014 he agreed to end his contract with the club.

International career
Tulasne made two appearances for the France U21 national team in 2008 and 2009.

Honours
 Coupe Gambardella: 2007

References

External links
 
 
 

1988 births
Living people
Association football midfielders
French footballers
France youth international footballers
Ligue 1 players
Championnat National players
FC Sochaux-Montbéliard players
Red Star F.C. players